Amitav Mallik is an Indian defence technologist and the founder director of the Laser Science and Technology Center, Defence Research and Development Organization (DRDO), India, known for his expertise in the defence system design and development. He is an advisor to the National Security Advisory Board of India and a former advisor of Defence Technology at the Embassy of India in Washington DC. Author of a book on defence technology, Technology and Security in the 21st Century: A Demand-side Perspective, and more than 50 technical papers and over 100 classified analysis documents on defence technology, Mallik was honored by the Government of India, in 2002, with the fourth highest Indian civilian award, the Padma Shri.

Books

See also

 National Security Advisory Board
 Defence Research and Development Organization

References

External links

Recipients of the Padma Shri in science & engineering
Living people
20th-century Indian physicists
Indian technology writers
Defence Research and Development Organisation
Year of birth missing (living people)